The murder of Catherine Fuller was a violent sexual assault and murder which occurred in Washington, D.C. in 1984. The case led to a widely reported on trial in which seven co-defendants (Chris Turner, Charles Turner, Kelvin Smith, Levy Rouse, Clifton Yarborough, Timothy Catlett and Russell Overton) were tried and convicted of the crime. After allegations that the prosecution had suppressed evidence of another suspect an appeal was heard by the United States Supreme Court in Turner v. United States. The court upheld the conviction of the men.

Attack 
Catherine Fuller, a 49 year old housewife, was attacked on her way to the grocery store in Washington, D.C. on October 1, 1984. She was robbed of US$40 and jewelry. She was sodomized with a metal pipe and beaten to death. Her body was found by a street vendor in a garage in the alley behind the 800 block of H Street NE.

Arrests and investigation 
The police described the crime as a "gang attack". The police at the end of the investigation had arrested 17 individuals, all of whom were members of the alleged "8th and H Street" Crew.

Legacy 
The case contributed to the view that crime had become rampant in Washington  D.C and shaped the views of Washingtonians.

The case was the subject of an episode of the Netflix true crime documentary series, The Confession Tapes, which suggests that the confessions were falsified, and that the murder may have actually been committed by a convicted serial rapist and thief, James McMillan,  who lived and had been spotted in the area of the murder earlier that day.

See also
 Central Park jogger case / The Central Park Five
 False confession
 Innocence Project

References

Links

1984 in Washington, D.C.
Rapes in the United States
False confessions
1984 murders in the United States
American murder victims
Female murder victims
Deaths by beating in the United States
Murder in Washington, D.C.
Women in Washington, D.C.